Where No One Stands Alone is a compilation album by American singer Elvis Presley (1935–1977). It was released worldwide on August 10, 2018 by RCA Records and Legacy Recordings, entering at number one on Billboard's Christian Album chart and remaining there for two weeks and in the top ten for an additional two weeks. The album features archival vocal recordings of Elvis mostly from the gospel albums How Great Thou Art (1967) and He Touched Me (1972) accompanied by newly-recorded instrumentation and backing vocals. The album's title track, "Where No One Stands Alone", is a newly recorded duet with Lisa Marie Presley.

Track listing

Personnel
Credits adapted from AllMusic.

Roy Agee – trombone
Bill Baize – backing vocals
Terry Blackwood – backing vocals
Kevin Boettger – assistant mastering engineer
Mike Brignardello – bass
Pat Buchanan – electric guitar
Tom Burleigh – product development director
Jake Burns – assistant engineer
Tony Castle – engineer, vocal engineer
Taylor Chadwick  – assistant mastering engineer
Andy Childs – keyboards, producer, backing vocals
Christ Church Choir – backing vocals
Shawnel Corley – backing vocals
Andrew Darby – assistant mastering engineer
Josh Ditty – assistant engineer
Scott Ducaj – trumpet
Shannon Finnegan – production coordination
Terry Franklin – backing vocals
Gus Gaches – vocal arrangement, backing vocals
Bobbi Giel – assistant mastering engineer
John Guess – engineer
Tom Hemby – electric guitar
Roy Hendrickson – engineer
Ed Hill – backing vocals
Jim Horn – horn arrangements, saxophone
Cissy Houston – backing vocals
Garth Justice – engineer
Jennifer Kirell – project director
Matt Leigh – assistant engineer
Darlene Love – backing vocals

B. James Lowry – acoustic guitar
Steve Mandile – engineer, electric guitar
Greg Marrow – drums, percussion
Steve Mauldin – choir arrangement
Gale Mayes – backing vocals
Garren McCloud – backing vocals
Andrew Mendelson – Mastering
Armond Morales – backing vocals
Jim Murray – backing vocals
Phil Nitz – backing vocals
Daniel Palma – backing vocals
Denise Palma – backing vocals
Jim Parham – project director
Christopher Phillips – choir director
Elvis Presley – arranger
Lisa Marie Presley – producer
Angela Primm – backing vocals
Ed Seay – engineer, mixer, vocal engineer
Chaz Sexton – assistant engineer
Neal Shaw – assistant engineer
Shao Jean Sim – assistant engineer
Jimmie Lee Sloas – bass
Larry Strickland – backing vocals
Donnie Sumner – backing vocals
Robb Tripp – backing vocals
Jason Perks – keyboards
Joel Weinshanker – producer
Lonnie Wilson – drums, percussion
Ryan Yount – assistant engineer

Charts

References 

2018 compilation albums
Elvis Presley compilation albums
Compilation albums published posthumously